Atanasie Rednic (1722–1772) was Bishop of Făgăraş and Primate of the Romanian Greek Catholic Church from 1765 to his death in 1772.

Life
Atanasie Rednic was born in February 1722 in Giulești, Maramureș from an influential family. He studied by the Jesuits in Cluj and from 1743 in the Institute Pazmanian in Vienna, where he graduated in theology in 1747. He moved to the monastery in Mukachevo of the Order of Saint Basil the Great and in 1749 he took the monastic vows and was ordained a priest. From 1751 he moved to Blaj, where he cooperated with bishop Petru Pavel Aron in spreading instruction: he founded schools and was appointed the rector of the seminary, and later he became the vicar of the bishop.

On 30 June 1764, following the death of the Primate of the Romanian Greek Catholic Church, the bishop of Făgăraş Petru Pavel Aron, the electoral synod convened and Rednic ranked only fourth in the results. Nevertheless, and against the will of the monks, the Habsburg monarch, Empress Maria Theresa, designated him as new bishop. Rednic accepted asking efforts from the government to improve the conditions of the clergy. Pope Clement XIII confirmed the designation on 15 May 1765, and Rednic moved from Vienna to the Carpathian Ruthenia, where he was consecrated bishop on 4 August 1765 by M. Olsavszky, the Eparch of Mukachevo. He later arrived to Blaj, where he was enthroned on 13 November 1765.

As bishop, he continued to ask financial support from the government to improve the conditions of the parishes and of the schools, without great results. He also tried to revitalise the monastic life in Blaj introducing a strict discipline which he himself followed. He also continued to support instruction, enlisting the more cultured monks as teachers, and providing aid grants for student to study abroad.

Rednic lived an ascetic life. He ate only vegetables and never wore silk clothing.

He died in Blaj on 2 May 1772.

Notes

1722 births
1772 deaths
18th-century Eastern Catholic bishops
18th-century Romanian people
Romanian people in the Principality of Transylvania (1711–1867)
Order of Saint Basil the Great
Primates of the Romanian Greek Catholic Church